Las grandes aguas (English title: The great waters) is a Mexican telenovela produced by Carlos Sotomayor for Televisa in 1989.

Gonzalo Vega and Alma Muriel starred the protagonists, while José Carlos Ruiz starred as main antagonist.

Plot 
Adaptation of the novel by Luis Spota, which is a testimony to the brutality of man against the life, nature, and destiny. The story begins when Roberto Rivas, an ambitious engineer, is commissioned to build a large dam in a place away from civilization, a small community in which among its people arises only incomprehension, hatred, resentment, passions and betrayals. Here also find wood, the wife of Robert, a woman deeply unhappy and eager to find happiness.

Cast 
 Alma Muriel as Lena de Rivas/Yolanda
 Gonzalo Vega as Roberto Rivas
 Daniel Rodríguez as Danielin
 José Carlos Ruiz as Graciano Alonso
 Antonio Medellín as Antonio Álvarez
 Noé Murayama as Don Lupe
 Roberto Carrera as Sergio Peña
 Constantino Costas as Ángel Ocampo
 Alicia Fahr as Araceli de Ramos
 Jerardo as Rogelio Urbieta
 Irma Infante as Amalia de Álvarez
 David Reynoso as Don Artemio Rozas
 Juan Carlos Muñoz as Chinto
 Lili Blanco as María Alonso
 Pedro Infante as Óscar Ramos
 Gabriela Obregón as Sofía Álvarez
 Ivette Proal as Lorena
 Ramón Valdés Urtiz as Robertito Rivas

References

External links 

1989 telenovelas
Mexican telenovelas
Televisa telenovelas
1989 Mexican television series debuts
1989 Mexican television series endings
Spanish-language telenovelas
Television shows set in Mexico